Río Pícaro is a river of southeastern Andalusia, Spain. Originating in the Sierra del Bujeo /Sierra del Algarrobo, it flows for  into the Bay of Algeciras, not far from Algeciras. The terrain of the river course is rugged; Pícaro is Spanish for rogue.

References

Rivers of Spain
Rivers of Andalusia
Algeciras